Buckleria brasilia is a species of moth in the genus Buckleria known from Brazil. Its host plant is Drosera graminifolia. Moths in this species take flight in May and have a wingspan of about 11-12 millimetres. The specific name refers to Brazil.

References

Oxyptilini
Endemic fauna of Brazil
Lepidoptera of Brazil
Moths of South America
Pterophoridae of South America
Moths described in 2006